Melvin Parker (June 7, 1944 – December 3, 2021) was an American drummer. He and his brother, saxophonist Maceo Parker, were key members of James Brown's band.

Life and career
Parker was born in Kinston, North Carolina on June 7, 1944. His drumming style was a major ingredient in Brown's funk music innovations in the 1960s. In 1964 and 1965 Parker was the drummer on three of Brown's recordings: "Out of Sight," "Papa's Got A Brand New Bag," and "I Got You (I Feel Good)."

"The greatest drummer I ever had in my life was Melvin Parker," Brown reflected in 2004. "'I Feel Good', 'Papa's Bag' (sic) – nobody ever did that. Nobody. And they can't do it now. And if I was getting ready to cut a record that was right, I would go get Melvin today, because he's just like a metronome."

Parker's first association with Brown ended when he was drafted in the mid-1960s. He was replaced in the band by Clyde Stubblefield and Jabo Starks. Parker rejoined Brown's band in 1969, and appeared on the album Sex Machine.

In 1970, Parker was part of a mutiny by Brown's band. After leaving Brown, Parker joined his brother Maceo's band, Maceo & All the King's Men. He rejoined Brown briefly in 1976, and played on the hit "Get Up Offa That Thing".

References

External links
 " The Great Drummers of R&B Funk & Soul" By Jim Payne, Harry Weinger 2007
 

1944 births
2021 deaths
20th-century American drummers
African-American drummers
American funk drummers
American male drummers
James Brown Orchestra members
The J.B.'s members
People from Kinston, North Carolina